In graph theory, the Graham–Pollak theorem states that the edges of an -vertex complete graph cannot be partitioned into fewer than  complete bipartite graphs. It was first published by Ronald Graham and Henry O. Pollak in two papers in 1971 and 1972, in connection with an application to telephone switching circuitry.

The theorem has since become well known and repeatedly studied and generalized in graph theory, in part because of its elegant proof using techniques from algebraic graph theory. More strongly,  write that all proofs are somehow based on linear algebra: "no combinatorial proof for this result is known".

Construction of an optimal partition
A partition into exactly  complete bipartite graphs is easy to obtain: just order the vertices, and for each vertex except the last, form a star connecting it to all later vertices in the ordering. Other partitions are also possible.

Proof of optimality

Then, in terms of this notation, the fact that the bipartite graphs partition the edges of the complete graph can be expressed as the equation

Any solution to this system of equations would also obey the nonlinear equations

But a sum of squares of real variables can only be zero if all the individual variables are zero, the trivial solution to the system of linear equations.
If there were fewer than  complete bipartite graphs, the system of equations would have fewer than  equations in  unknowns and would have a nontrivial solution, a contradiction. So the number of complete bipartite graphs must be at least .

Related problems

Distance labeling
Graham and Pollak study a more general graph labeling problem, in which the vertices of a graph should be labeled with equal-length strings of the characters "0", "1", and "✶", in such a way that the distance between any two vertices equals the number of string positions where one vertex is labeled with a 0 and the other is labeled with a 1. A labeling like this with no "✶" characters would give an isometric embedding into a hypercube, something that is only possible for graphs that are partial cubes, and in one of their papers Graham and Pollak call a labeling that allows "✶" characters an embedding into a "squashed cube".

For each position of the label strings, one can define a complete bipartite graph in which one side of the bipartition consists of the vertices labeled with 0 in that position and the other side consists of the vertices labeled with 1, omitting the vertices labeled "✶". For the complete graph, every two vertices are at distance one from each other, so every edge must belong to exactly one of these complete graphs. In this way, a labeling of this type for the complete graph corresponds to a partition of its edges into complete bipartite graphs,
with the lengths of the labels corresponding to the number of graphs in the partition.

Alon–Saks–Seymour conjecture
Noga Alon, Michael Saks, and Paul Seymour formulated a conjecture in the early 1990s that, if true, would significantly generalize the Graham–Pollak theorem: they conjectured that, whenever a graph of chromatic number  has its edges partitioned into complete bipartite subgraphs, at least  subgraphs are needed. Equivalently, their conjecture states that edge-disjoint unions of  complete bipartite graphs can always be colored with at most  colors. The conjecture was disproved by Huang and Sudakov in 2012, who constructed families of graphs formed as edge-disjoint unions of  complete bipartite graphs that require  colors.

Biclique partition
The biclique partition problem takes as input an arbitrary undirected graph, and asks for a partition of its edges into a minimum number of complete bipartite graphs. It is NP-hard, but fixed-parameter tractable.

References

Algebraic graph theory